Keys to the City is a studio album by Ramsey Lewis, released in May 1987 on Columbia Records. The album peaked at #22 on the Billboard Top Contemporary Jazz Albums chart and #11 on the Cashbox Jazz Albums chart.

Background
Keys to the City was recorded at E & S Studios in Los Angeles, California; Home Sweet Home Studio in Evanston, Illinois; and Streeterville Studios in Chicago, Illinois.

Critical reception

Frank White of The Atlanta Journal-Constitution noted that Lewis "lets the fire roar to the surface."

Track listing

Personnel
Ramsey Lewis - DX-7, Piano
Roland Bautista -	Guitar
Tony Brown - Bass
Chris Brunt - Drums, Percussion
Chris Cameron - Synthesizer
Larry Dunn - Bass, Drums, Keyboards, Percussion
Steven Dunn - Drums, Percussion
Byron Gregory - Electric guitar
Luisa Justiz - Vocals
Brenda Mitchell-Stewart - Background vocals
Don Myrick - Saxophone
Joe Pusteri - Percussion
Bill Ruppert - Electric guitar
Robyn Smith - Drum Programming, Percussion, Synthesizer
Morris Stewart - Synthesizer, Background vocals
Wayne Stewart - Drums
Maurice White - Percussion

Charts

References

1987 albums
Albums produced by Maurice White
Ramsey Lewis albums
Columbia Records albums